The women's Over 70 kg (+154 lbs) Semi-Contact category at the W.A.K.O. World Championships 2007 in Coimbra was the heaviest of the female Light-Contact tournaments being the equivalent of the super heavyweight division when compared to Full-Contact's weight classes. There were eight women from two continents (Europe and North America) taking part in the competition.  Each of the matches was three rounds of two minutes each and were fought under Semi-Contact rules.

The tournament gold medal went to Hungary's Anna Kondar who defeated Ireland's Natalie Cassidy in the final by points decision.  Defeated semi finalists Russia's Oxana Kinakh (who had won gold in the Light-Contact category in Belgrade earlier that year) and Great Britain's Rosemarie James won bronze medals for their efforts in reaching the semi finals.

Results
These matches were decided on points.

See also
List of WAKO Amateur World Championships
List of WAKO Amateur European Championships
List of female kickboxers

References

External links
 WAKO World Association of Kickboxing Organizations Official Site

Kickboxing events at the WAKO World Championships 2007 Coimbra
2007 in kickboxing
Kickboxing in Portugal